David James Syvret (born October 28, 1954) is a Canadian former professional ice hockey player who played in the World Hockey Association (WHA). Syvret played parts of two WHA seasons with the Toronto Toros and Birmingham Bulls. He was drafted in the ninth round of the 1974 NHL amateur draft by the Toronto Maple Leafs. He is the father of Danny Syvret, who played in the National Hockey League and currently plays in the American Hockey League, and Corey Syvret, who was a 2007 sixth-round draft pick of the Florida Panthers and currently plays in the ECHL.

References

External links

1954 births
Living people
Binghamton Dusters players
Birmingham Bulls players
Buffalo Norsemen players
Canadian ice hockey defencemen
Hamilton Red Wings (OHA) players
Ice hockey people from Ontario
Sportspeople from Hamilton, Ontario
Phoenix Roadrunners (CHL) players
St. Catharines Black Hawks players
Toronto Maple Leafs draft picks
Toronto Toros players